Wool on Wolves is a Canadian folk-rock band based in Edmonton, Alberta. The band formed in October 2008 while attending the University of Alberta.

Wool on Wolves debut EP Hate is Poor was self-released in April 2010, followed by their début album Grey Matter on November 9, 2010. "Measures of Progress", the band's sophomore LP, was released on November 13, 2012.

Wool on Wolves was named Best Folk/Roots and Best Group at the 2011 Edmonton Music Awards.  Grey Matter was nominated for a 2011 Western Canadian Music Award in the Best Rock category.

The band announced their performance on Friday, September 26, 2014 would likely be their last.

Members
As a group of multi-instrumentalists, Wool on Wolves is known to frequently switch instruments for both live and recorded performances.
 Thomas Reikie - Lead vocals, guitar, harmonica, banjo, lap steel
 Eric Leydon - piano, drums, percussion, trumpet, guitar, vocals
 Gordon Brasnett - guitar, bass, piano, lap steel, vocals
 Brody Irvine - bass, guitar, vocals, violin, cello, piano
 Kevin George - drums, banjo, vocals, glockenspiel

Discography
 Hate is Poor EP (April, 2010)
 Grey Matter (November, 2010)
 Measures of Progress (November 13, 2012)

References

External links
 Wool on Wolves on Facebook
 Wool on Wolves on Twitter
 Wool on Wolves on Bandcamp
 Wool on Wolves on CBC 3

Musical groups established in 2008
Musical groups from Edmonton
Canadian indie rock groups
2008 establishments in Alberta